The Lichtental Parish Church is the Roman Catholic parish church of Lichtental, now part of Vienna, Austria. The church has elements of Baroque and Neoclassical architecture.

History

After the suburb Lichtental was founded at the turn of the 18th century, religious services were first held at the local brewery. In 1711 a chapel consecrated to St. Anna was built in the middle of the new settlement. In 1712, Charles VI laid the foundation for a church. The building was probably designed by Johann Lukas von Hildebrandt and Andrea Pozzo. The first Solemn Mass was held in 1714, although the church was still unfinished.

In 1723, Lichtental became an independent parish. The first pastor was Carl de Giorgio. The building was completed in 1730 and consecrated to the Fourteen Holy Helpers. An organ was installed in 1738. Facing a rapidly growing population, the church was expanded to its present size, from 1769 to 1773. The foundation was laid by Maria Theresia. It shows elements of the transition from Baroque to Neoclassical architecture.

The plans were designed by Joseph Ritter and Thaddäus Kärner. The high altar was created in 1776 by court architect Ferdinand Hetzendorf von Hohenberg. Franz Anton Zoller, a member of the Academy of Fine Arts, created its painting, showing the Fourteen Holy Helpers. The second tower was finished only in 1827.

Schubert 

Composer Franz Schubert was baptised in the church on 1 February 1797. It was here he received his first musical training. In 1814, at age 17, he was commissioned to compose a missa solemnis for the centenary of the church, his first mass in F major. He conducted its first performance on 25 September 1814. His later masses in G major, B-flat major and C major were also composed for Lichtental Church, as well as other sacred music.

References

Literature 

 Erich Benedikt: Franz Schubert und die Pfarrkirche Lichtental. Verlag St. Peter, Salzburg 1997, 
 Erich Benedikt: Die Musikhandschriften des Pfarrarchivs Wien-Lichtental. Verlag Der Apfel, Wien 2006, 
 Alfred Wolf: Alsergrund-Chronik. Von der Römerzeit bis zum Ende der Monarchie. Wien 1981

External links 

 

Roman Catholic churches in Vienna
1730 establishments in Austria
18th-century Roman Catholic church buildings in Austria
Roman Catholic churches completed in 1730
Baroque church buildings in Austria